Fulvia Franco  (21 May 1931 – 15 May 1988) was an Italian actress, model and beauty pageant titleholder.

Life and career 
Born in Trieste, the daughter of a businessman, Franco won the third edition of the Miss Italia beauty contest held in 1948 in Stresa. As the winner, Franco was also awarded a small role in an upcoming movie, Totò al giro d'Italia, starring Totò, who was a member of the jury. Thanks to the success of the film, Franco continued her film career, even appearing in leading roles; her most significant and critically appreciated role was the sensual widow in L’avventura di un soldato, the directorial debut of Nino Manfredi which was part of the anthology film L'amore difficile.

Franco was married to the actor and boxer Tiberio Mitri for about twenty years, and she starred with him on several fotoromanzi.

Partial filmography 

 Toto Tours Italy (1948) - Miss Italia
 Romanticismo (1949) - Mrs. Pochini
 Toto in Color (1952) - Poppy
 Il romanzo della mia vita (1952) - Clara Ricci
 Primo premio: Mariarosa (1952)
 Beauties on Motor Scooters (1952) - Marcella
 Finalmente libero! (1953) - Giuditta
 Matrimonial Agency (1953) - Mara
 Tripoli, Beautiful Land of Love (1954) - Nadia
 Bertoldo, Bertoldino e Cacasenno (1954) - Ortensia
 Toto in Hell (1955) - Una moglie
 Carovana di canzoni (1955)
 Le avventure di Giacomo Casanova (1955) - Bettina
 La rossa (1955) - Amelia - detta 'La Rossa'
 La moglie è uguale per tutti (1955) - Agatina Cuccurullo
 Scapricciatiello (1955) - Carmela
 La catena dell'odio (1955) - Lidia
 Donne, amore e matrimoni (1956) - Maria
 The Knight of the Black Sword (1957) - Livia
 Le belle dell'aria (1957) - Edmunda
 The Lady Doctor (1957) - Caterina
 Peppino, le modelle e chella là (1957) - Lucia
 Onore e sangue (1957) - Arturo's Fiancée
 Buongiorno primo amore! (1957) - Leandra
 A sud niente di nuovo (1957) - Fulvia
 Tempest (1958) - Palaska
 Hercules Unchained (1959) - Anticlea - Mother of Ulysses
 The Black Archer (1959) - La zingara
 Some Like It Cold (1961) - Luisa
 Of Wayward Love (1962) - La vedova (segment "L'avventura di un soldato")
 Obiettivo ragazze (1963) - Dolores
 Hercules, Samson and Ulysses (1963) - Ithaca Queen
 High Infidelity (1964) - Raffaella (segment "Scandaloso")
 Queste pazze pazze donne (1964) - The Lady ('Pochi ma buoni'
 Massacre at Marble City (1964) - Ilona
 Letti sbagliati (1965) - La moglie du Filippo (segment "00-Sexy, missione bionda platino")
 A Coffin for the Sheriff (1965) - Lulu Belle
 L'armata Brancaleone (1966) - Luisa
 Two Sons of Ringo (1966) - Margaret
 Una rete piena di sabbia (1966)
 Il magnifico Texano (1967) - Estella
 Brutti di notte (1968) - Madame Ananas
 Don Chisciotte and Sancio Panza (1968) - Duchess
 Mercanti di vergini (1969)
 Tara Pokì (1971) - Donna Grazia (final film role)

References

External links 

1931 births
1988 deaths
Actors from Trieste
Italian beauty pageant winners
Italian film actresses
20th-century Italian actresses